Chris Petersen (born 1964) is a former American college football coach.

Chris Petersen or Christopher Petersen may also refer to:

Chris Petersen (actor) (born 1963), American child actor in the 1970s and 1980s
Chris Petersen (baseball) (born 1970), American baseball player
Chris Petersen (born 1983), American guitarist for metal band Cellador
Pseudonym of Pieter Boevé

See also
Christopher Peterson (disambiguation)